Anomaloglossus tamacuarensis is a species of frog in the family Aromobatidae. It is found in the Sierra Tapirapecó in the Amazonas state of Venezuela as well as in the adjacent Amazonas state of Brazil (where the range is known as Serra do Tapirapecó).

Etymology
The specific name tamacuarensis refers to the type locality, Pico Tamacuari in the Sierra Tapirapecó.

Description
The type series consists of two adult males, two adult females, and four juveniles. The males measure , the females , and the juveniles  in snout–vent length. The head is little wider than it is long. The tympanum is inconspicuous. The fingers have fringes but no webbing; the toes are moderately webbed. The dorsum is brown to yellowish brown with darker brown markings; dorsal skin is granular. There is a poorly defined, pale oblique lateral line. Males have gray throat, white-stippled chin, and pale dirty green or yellowish venter, where females have pale gray or silvery white throats and silvery white venters.

Anomaloglossus tamacuarensis resembles Anomaloglossus shrevei from the Duida-Marahuaca Massif.

Habitat and conservation
Anomaloglossus tamacuarensis is found in or near rocky forest streams. It is active both day and night. Males call from beneath large boulders. Not much information is known about this species but flash flooding is thought to threaten it as the flooding occurs in its habitat. The species is protected by the Parima Tapirapecó National Park in Venezuela.

References

tamacuarensis
Amphibians of Brazil
Amphibians of Venezuela
Amphibians described in 1997
Taxonomy articles created by Polbot